Shonisaurus is a genus of very large ichthyosaurs. At least 37 incomplete fossil specimens of the marine reptile have been found in the Luning Formation of Nevada, USA. This formation dates to the late Carnian age of the late Triassic period, about 237–227 million years ago.

Description

Shonisaurus lived during the Carnian stage of the late Triassic period. A second species from British Columbia was named Shonisaurus sikanniensis in 2004. However, phylogenetic studies later showed S. sikanniensis to be a species of Shastasaurus rather than Shonisaurus.
A new study published in 2013 reasserted the original classification, finding it more closely related to Shonisaurus than to Shastasaurus. In the 2019 study, S. sikanniensis was pertained within the genus Shastasaurus. In the 2021 analysis, S. sikanniensis forms a clade with Shonisaurus, indicating that it is closer to Shonisaurus than to Shastasaurus. Specimens belonging to S. sikanniensis have been found in the Pardonet Formation British Columbia, dating to the middle Norian age (about 210 million years ago).

Shonisaurus had a long snout, and its flippers were much longer and narrower than in other ichthyosaurs. While Shonisaurus was initially reported to have had socketed teeth (rather than teeth set in a groove as in more advanced forms), these were present only at the jaw tips, and only in the very smallest, juvenile specimens. All of these features suggest that Shonisaurus may be a relatively specialised offshoot of the main ichthyosaur evolutionary line. More recent finds however indicate that Shonisaurus possessed teeth in all ontogenetic stages. It was historically depicted with a rather rotund body, but studies of its body shape since the early 1990s have shown that the body was much more slender than traditionally thought. S. popularis had a relatively deep body compared with related marine reptiles.

Although it is not known if Shonisaurus had one, a more basal ichthyosaur Mixosaurus had a dorsal fin.

History

Fossils of Shonisaurus were first found in a large deposit in Nevada in 1920. Thirty years later, they were excavated, uncovering the remains of 37 very large ichthyosaurs. These were named Shonisaurus, which means "lizard from the Shoshone Mountains", after the formation where the fossils were found.

S. popularis, was adopted as the state fossil of Nevada in 1984. Excavations, begun in 1954 under the direction of Charles Camp and  Samuel Welles of the University of California, Berkeley, were continued by Camp throughout the 1960s. It was named by Charles Camp in 1976.

The Nevada fossil sites can currently be viewed at the Berlin-Ichthyosaur State Park.

Paleoenvironment

Taphonomy
The Nevada bonebed represents a large assemblage of Shonisaurus which died at varying times and became preserved on the sea floor in a curiously regular arrangement of bones. The lack of fossil invertebrates encrusting the remains indicates that the carcasses sank in relatively deep water poor in oxygen.

See also 

Largest prehistoric organisms
Shastasaurus, a relative of Shonisaurus
Temnodontosaurus, another large ichthyosaur
 List of ichthyosaurs
 Timeline of ichthyosaur research

Notes

References 
 Dixon, Dougal. "The Complete Book of Dinosaurs." Hermes House, 2006.
 
 Camp, C.L. 1981. Child of the rocks, the story of Berlin-Ichthyosaur State Park. Nevada Bureau of Mines and Geology special publication 5.
 Cowen, R. 1995. History of life. Cambridge, Massachusetts: Blackwell Scientific.

External links 
 Nevada Division of State Parks
 The ICHTHYOSAUR — Nevada's State Fossil.

Triassic ichthyosaurs
Late Triassic ichthyosaurs of North America
Triassic geology of Nevada
Fossils of Nevada
Taxa named by Charles Lewis Camp
Ichthyosauromorph genera